Ladies and Gentlewomen is a Tamil language, Indian documentary by Malini Jeevarathnam and produced by Pa. Ranjith. It is about love, life, and suicide among lesbians. The documentary also features a "Lesbian Anthem" for which the music was composed by Justin Prabhakaran and lyrics were penned by Kutti Revati and Damayanthi.

Synopsis

Ladies and GentleWomen is an attempt to break the silence in the area of comprehending the dynamics of lesbianism .Probably the first move in Tamil scenario , this Documentary aims to dialogue about the conspicuous silence around the body politics and Relationship which is misspelt as social Stigma. challenging the silence emerged from constant fight against Socially accepted identities. With absolutely no response to the suicidal cases, the Social Rejection of lesbianism leads to the documentary sternly projecting the question to the society .

" Why the hell , do you care about Someone's love When you dont care a speck about someone's suicide?"

The documentary narrates the tale of Tija and Bija, a lesbian couple believed to be from Rajasthan, and is also about a Tamil folktale that features the lovers Pappathi and Karupaayi. It also features different perspectives on lesbian women from LGBTQ activists, journalists, lawyers and common people. She says her main aim is to increase the visibility of queer women and to save lesbian women from committing suicide or them being a subject of honor killings.

Production
Director claimed the research for the film took her one-and-a-half years, and the movie took three years to complete altogether. Her main intention, she claims, is to bring focus to the deaths of LGBT persons and their sufferings. As a part of the research, Malini met around 85 women from the Queer community. Many were not ready to talk about their sexuality in front of the camera.
The film premiered at the Chennai Rainbow Film Festival in Chennai on 8 January 2017.

Awards and nominations
This documentary has received  Best   Documentary awards  at the Norway Tamil Film Festival, nominated for an award at the Pune International Queer Film Festival Out & Loud, and received many other accolades around the world. It has been screening at 11  different international film festivals and has won the Best Documentary award at three of them. In India, the movie has been screen at Chennai International Queer Film Festival, Bangalore Queer Film Festival, Hyderabad chapter of Queer Campus Bangalore and received rave reviews in many other cities.

2017 Chennai Rainbow Film Festival
 Won: Best Documentary

2017 Norway Tamil Film Festival
 Won: Best Documentary

References

2010s Tamil-language films
Indian films based on actual events
2017 films
Documentary films about lesbians
Indian LGBT-related films
Indian docudrama films
2017 LGBT-related films